Phillips Park is an urban park  in Carrick, a neighborhood of Pittsburgh.

History
Also known as Dilly's Grove, Southern Park and Carrick Park, it was originally a Trolley Park with vaudeville acts, roller coasters, merry go rounds and other attractions.  At one time, it was at the end of the line for public transit from Pittsburgh.
Dilly's Grove was purchased in 1904 for $29,000. The park is named for John MacFarlane Phillips, who organized the first Boy Scout troop in Pennsylvania.

Present Facilities
Phillips Park is known for its Disc Golf Course.

External links
 Pittsburgh Dept. of Parks & Recreation website

References

Parks in Pittsburgh